Ziadabad (also Romanized as Zīādābād and Zeyādābād) is a village in Khobriz Rural District, in the Central District of Arsanjan County, Fars Province, Iran. At the 2006 census, its population was 387, in 110 families.

References 

Populated places in Arsanjan County